The Smith Hill Library-Providence Community Library is one of the branch libraries of the Providence, Rhode Island, public library system.  It is located at 31 Candace Street, in a single-story brick building designed by Albert Harkness and built in 1932 by contractor Clifford K. Rathbone.  Stylistically the building is a mixture of Colonial Revival and Moderne features.  The Smith Hill branch began as a delivery station in 1907, and had grown to occupy leased space, with an annual circulation of more than 70,000, by 1929.  Circulation rose rapidly after the building's completion, reaching 119,000 in just three years.  The building continues to act as a significant local community resource.

The library was added to the National Register of Historic Places in 1998.

See also
List of libraries in Rhode Island
National Register of Historic Places listings in Providence, Rhode Island
Rochambeau Library-Providence Community Library
Wanskuck Library-Providence Community Library
South Providence Library-Providence Community Library
Fox Point Library-Providence Community Library
Mount Pleasant Library-Providence Community Library
Olneyville Library-Providence Community Library
Washington Park Library-Providence Community Library
Knight Memorial Library-Providence Community Library

References

External links
Friends of Smith Hill Community Library website
Providence Community Library website

Library buildings completed in 1932
Public libraries in Rhode Island
Libraries on the National Register of Historic Places in Rhode Island
Buildings and structures in Providence, Rhode Island
Education in Providence County, Rhode Island
National Register of Historic Places in Providence, Rhode Island